The Other Conquest (Spanish: La Otra Conquista) is a 1999 Mexican historical drama film written and directed by Salvador Carrasco, produced by Alvaro Domingo, and executive produced by Plácido Domingo. The film is set during the aftermath of the 1520s Spanish Conquest of the Aztec Empire, viewed primarily from the perspective of the Aztecs. The plot begins after the Massacre in the Great Temple in Tenochtitlan, and follows a lone Aztec scribe named Topiltzin , who is captured by Hernan Cortés and placed in the care of a friar.

Samuel Zyman's score was recorded by the Academy of Saint Martin in the Fields, conducted by David Snell and performed by Plácido Domingo.  Released by Twentieth Century Fox in 1999, the film received positive reviews and was a Mexican box office success. The film was rereleased for the United States in 2008.

Plot
Topilzin, a scribe and the illegitimate son of Montezuma, finds himself at odds with the new Spanish rule. Refusing the new Christian religion and assaulting a friar, Topilzin is handed over to the army by his brother and brought to Hernán Cortés and his lover, Tecuichpo. Topilzin's life is spared and he is flogged in public, receiving a spiritual revelation. Topilzin abandons his life as a scribe to become a monk, joining an order led by friar Diego.

Cast
Damián Delgado as Topiltzin / Tomás
José Carlos Rodríguez as Fray Diego de La Coruña
Elpidia Carrillo as Tecuichpo / Doña Isabel
Iñaki Aierra as Hernando Cortés
Honorato Magaloni as Capitán Cristóbal Quijano
Guillermo Ríos as Alanpoyatzin - brother
Diana Bracho as Doña Juana
Carlos Torres Torrija as Soldier Héctor (credited as Carlos Torrestorija)

Reception

Box office
Distributed by Twentieth Century Fox, the film was released in Mexico in 1999 by Twentieth Century Fox, "enjoying the biggest opening weekend of any Mexican film in history on its home turf".

Critical response
Rotten Tomatoes gives a score of 85% based on 13 reviews. The film's song-cycle Solamente Sola was descibred as "couched in effusive and seductive folk styles... a hauntingly evocative cycle on poems by Salvador Carrasco".

References

External links
 
 The Other Conquest official website (archive)

1999 films
2000 drama films
2000 films
Mexican independent films
2000s Spanish-language films
Nahuatl-language films
Films about conquistadors
Films set in the Aztec Triple Alliance
Films set in the 1520s
Indigenous cinema in Latin America
Cultural depictions of Hernán Cortés
1990s Mexican films